Ushtibin (also Romanized as Ūshtobīn; also known as Oshtī”n, Oshtowbīn, Oshtūbīn, Uchtubin, and Ūshtowbīn) is a village in Nowjeh Mehr Rural District, Siah Rud District, Jolfa County, East Azerbaijan Province, Iran. At the 2006 census, its population was 653, in 145 families.

References 

Populated places in Jolfa County